Take Me When You Go is the debut studio album by Australian-American recording artist Betty Who, released on 3 October 2014 by RCA Records. The album is preceded by the extended plays The Movement, Slow Dancing and Worlds Apart.

Who writes from the perspective of a millennial learning to navigate breakups, loves of all shapes and sizes, and coming to terms with her own growing maturity. In an interview with Billboard she said "A lot of the relationships that inspired this record ended with me coming to terms with [the fact] that I love myself far too much to be anybody's second choice. That was a huge growth for me that led to the arc, the storyline of this record."

Commercial performance
Take Me When You Go debuted at number 68 on the Billboard 200, selling 5,000 copies in its first week.

Critical reception

Take Me When You Go received general acclaim upon release. Heather Phares from AllMusic said; "Take Me When You Go has a lot of appealing moments". Phares complemented "The Whitney Houston-inspired 'Somebody Loves You'", and said "'Heartbreak Dream' remains soaringly romantic and 'Alone Again' continues to charm with its flirtatious yet bittersweet melody and slowly shredding guitar solo, which gives even more cred to Who's '80s devotion." Janine Schaults from Consequence of Sound said "Combining Adele's hopeless romanticism, Pink's spunky streak, and Madonna's early whimsy seems like a potion ready-made for radio domination...Yet, Miss Betty can't shake a 'been there, done that' feel." but added "That's not to say [Who] doesn't conjure exquisite moments. Coincidentally, these fleeting instances of perfection occur when she strips away all the trimmings of a pop princess." Robbie Daw from Idolator said "Bottom line: Betty Who's first album is as good as you hoped. In that regard, she's done her job and delivered on the promise of that first EP from 18 months ago." Enio Chiola from PopMatters said "It's an album filled to the brim with tracks that, on their own, are really quite good, but lack enough diversity to keep you interested for all 13 songs." Chiola complemented tracks "Just Like Me", "High Society", "Glory Days" and "Somebody Loves You".

Brennan Carley from Spin magazine said "Betty is at her absolute best when she lets us see the cracks in her gloss, like on the halting wallop of an album opener 'Just Like Me'" and said the stand out track is "Dreaming About You", adding "[it's] a smart dance album that's both totally of the moment and also mindful of its lengthy list of pop predecessors." Spinalso included the album on their list of the best albums of 2014.

Track listing

Notes
  signifies a vocal producer
  signifies an additional producer
  signifies an additional vocal producer

Personnel
Credits adapted from the liner notes of Take Me When You Go.

 Betty Who – vocals ; gang vocals ; keyboards ; additional instrumentation, piano, programming ; executive producer
 Helene Valvatne Andås – back tray image
 John August – backing vocals, gang vocals ; additional programming 
 Pran Bandi – engineering 
 Lindsey Cook – A&R
 Chris Gehringer – mastering
 Serban Ghenea – mixing 
 Erwin Gorostiza – creative director
 John Hanes – engineering for mix 
 David Ryan Harris – additional instrumentation, guitar, guitar solo, keyboards, production, programming 
 Michelle Holme – art direction, design
 Marcus Johnson – engineering assistance 
 Martin Johnson – acoustic guitar ; additional instrumentation, backing vocals, gang vocals, keyboards, piano ; bass, electric guitar, engineering, percussion, production, programming 
 Claude Kelly – additional vocal production 
 Manya Kuzemchenko – cover design
 Mag – additional instrumentation, bass, guitar, keyboards, piano, production, programming 
 Shane McCauley – photography
 Molly McCook – additional backing vocals 
 Kyle Moorman – additional production, engineering ; programming ; gang vocals 

 Vaughn Oliver – mixing ; additional instrumentation, guitar, keyboards, production, programming 
 Brandon Paddock – additional production, engineering, programming ; gang vocals ; bass 
 Nick Price – gang vocals 
 Mike Roberts – additional engineering ; engineering ; mixing 
 Max Schad – mixing 
 Ethan Schiff – management
 John Schmidt – engineering assistance 
 Starsmith – drum programming, keyboards, mixing, production, synthesizer 
 Peter Thomas – bass ; additional instrumentation, programming ; keyboards ; production ; guitar ; gang vocals ; piano ; additional production ; executive producer
 Jay Vice – engineering ; vocal production ; additional vocal production ; additional programming 
 Eric Von – engineering 
 Miles Walker – mixing

Charts

Release history

References

2014 debut albums
Betty Who albums
RCA Records albums